Zachary Burns (born December 25, 1996 in Ann Arbor, Michigan) is an American rower. He competed at the 2016 Summer Paralympics in Rio de Janeiro. Burns has won three silver medals from the World Rowing Championships and a silver medal from the 2016 Paralympic Games. He is a Royal Canadian Henley Regatta champion, four-time Head of the Charles Regatta champion, and two-time U.S. national champion. He was a member of the Paralympic Great Eight at the 2016 Head of the Charles Regatta consisting of gold, silver, and bronze Rio Paralympic medalists from Great Britain, United States, and Canada.

Career

Senior career

2013–2014 season
Burns won a silver medal in the Legs, Trunk, & Arms Mixed 4+ at the 2014 World Rowing Championships in Amsterdam, Netherlands.

2014–2015 season
Burns won a silver medal in the Legs, Trunk, & Arms Mixed 4+ at the 2015 World Rowing Championships in Aiguebelette, France.

2015–2016 season
Burns won a silver medal in the Legs, Trunk, & Arms Mixed 4+ at the 2016 Paralympic Games in Rio de Janeiro, Brazil.

2016–2017 season
Burns won a silver medal in the PR3 Mixed 4+ at the 2017 World Rowing Championships in Sarasota, Florida.

Senior

References

1996 births
Living people
Paralympic rowers of the United States
World Rowing Championships medalists for the United States
American male rowers
Medalists at the 2016 Summer Paralympics
Michigan Wolverines athletes
Paralympic medalists in rowing
Paralympic silver medalists for the United States
Rowers at the 2016 Summer Paralympics